Wayzata High School is a comprehensive public high school in Plymouth, Minnesota, United States, a suburb of Minneapolis. The high school, operated by Wayzata Public Schools, had about 3669 students in grades 9 to 12 as of 2021-22, making it Minnesota's largest secondary school by enrollment. The district boundaries include all or part of eight municipalities: Corcoran, Maple Grove, Medicine Lake, Medina, Minnetonka, Orono, Plymouth, and Wayzata. The school finished an expansion project in 2017 with the new capacity of 3,900. It is part of the Lake Conference. Scott Gengler is the principal.

In 2015, Newsweek ranked the school 150th on its "List of the 500 Top High Schools in America". U.S. News & World Report ranked the school 432nd among 21,000 schools nationally and 6th in Minnesota in 2021.

History 

The first school in the Wayzata area was established in around 1855. Classes were taught in homes until a one-room school was built near what is now the second green of the Wayzata Country Club. This school burned down for unknown reasons and a new school was constructed on what is now Wayzata's main street near downtown Wayzata.

What are now the West and Central middle schools were each once the high school building. The West Middle School building served as the high school from 1940 to 1960. Central Middle School's campus was home to the high school from 1960 to 1997. The current Wayzata High School campus was completed in 1997 and classes began in the 1997–98 school year.

On February 25, 2014, voters approved a referendum for a $109 million bond request to expand the high school and improve security and technology. Part of the provisions include the purchasing of adjacent land belonging to the Elm Creek Golf Course and the building of a new wing. Construction took place from 2014 to 2017.

Academics 
As of the 2015–16 school year, Wayzata High School offers 24 Advanced Placement classes and one Advanced Placement Pilot course (AP Accounting).

The school also hosts the Minnesota PSEO program, allowing students in 11th and 12th grades to receive college credit.

Wayzata High School has consistently exceeded the state and national average scores on the ACT.

In 2014, the school began a district-wide technology program that issued each student a district-owned iPad.

At the start of the 2016–17 school year, the school started a new support block called OurTime. It is designed to meet the students' academic needs during the school day. During this time, students receive academic support, participate in relearning, make up labs or tests and quizzes, study quietly, and collaborate with classmates on group projects. The block is 25 minutes and takes place between 2nd and 3rd period.

Extracurricular activities

Athletics
Wayzata is part of the Lake Conference and in the Minnesota State High School League. Wayzata was in the Classic Lake Conference before 2010–11. The school sponsors the following sports teams:

Fall
 Girls’ Soccer
 Boys’ Soccer
 Cheer team
 Girls' cross country
 Boys' cross country
 Football
 Girls' swimming and diving
 Girls' tennis
 Girls' volleyball
Winter
 Alpine ski racing
 Boys' basketball
 Girls' basketball
 Cheer team
 Dance team
 Gymnastics
 Boys' hockey
 Girls' hockey
 Nordic ski racing
 Boys' swimming and diving
 Wrestling
Spring
 Softball
 Boys' golf
 Girls' golf
 Boys' lacrosse
 Girls' lacrosse
 Baseball
 Synchronized swimming
 Boys' tennis
 Boys' track and field
 Girls' track and field

Girls' cross country won the Nike NXN National Cross Country Championship in 2013.

Clubs and activities
In the 2019 National Science Bowl Competition, Wayzata High School won the Final Championship against Dulles High School. The school also participated in the competition in 2011, 2014, 2018, and 2020.

Wayzata's quiz bowl team won both the NAQT Minnesota State Championship and Minnesota High School Quiz Bowl League in 2012, 2013, 2018, 2020, and 2021. It has performed well at the national level, placing T-8 in the High School National Championship Tournament in 2018 and 2021.

Wayzata participates in the Minnesota State High School Mathematics League, holding the season champion title for 11 years (20072017) and producing many state individual champions. Several Wayzata students travel to the American Regions Mathematics League held in University of Iowa and Harvard-MIT Mathematics Tournament as members of the Minnesota All-State Mathematics Team.

The 9th grade Knowledge Master Open team won the national spring KMO in the 9th grade division in 2009. The trivia team has been continued by two Questions Unlimited 3-2-1 teams, each composed of students in grades 9, 10, 11, and 12.

Notable alumni

Politicians
David Gaither (1975), former Minnesota state senator and Governor Tim Pawlenty's Chief of Staff
Betsy Hodges (1987), former mayor of Minneapolis
Amy Klobuchar (1978), U.S. senator representing Minnesota

Athletes
Heather Arseth (2011), swimmer in the 2012 Summer Olympics
Dominique Barber (2004), NFL player
Marion Barber III (2001), NFL player
Dick Beardsley (1975), marathon runner
Ariya Daivari (2007), professional wrestler
Shawn Daivari (2002), professional wrestler
François-Henri Désérable (2005), author and professional ice hockey player
Andrew Donlin (2011), professional team handball player
Joey Gerber (2015), professional baseball player
Ben Hamilton (1996), NFL player
Tim Herron (1989), professional golfer
James Laurinaitis (2005), NFL player
Mike Muller (1991), NHL player
Andrew Peterson (2003), former defender for the Columbus Crew
Ryan Saunders (2004), head coach of the Minnesota Timberwolves
A.J. Tarpley (2010), NFL player
Patrick Weah (2020), professional soccer player
Steve Wright (1977), NFL player contestant on Survivor: Redemption Island

Entertainment and music
David Bromstad (1992), interior designer and HGTV television show host
Kimberly Elise (1985), actress
Kirsten Gronfield (1996), actress
Charles Nolte (1941), Broadway and film actor
Emily Tyra (2005), actress, singer and dancer

Other
Andrew Tang (2018), chess grandmaster

Notable faculty 
 Terry Steinbach (1980), former head baseball coach
David Plummer (2013-2016), former head boys swim and dive coach

References

External links 
 
 Wayzata Public Schools District official website
“Wayzata High School.” Wayzata Public Schools, https://www.wayzataschools.org/whs. 

Public high schools in Minnesota
Educational institutions established in 1903
Wayzata, Minnesota
Schools in Hennepin County, Minnesota
1903 establishments in Minnesota